Jejungwon is a 2010 South Korean period medical drama television series about the founding and early years of Jejungwon, the first modern Western hospital in the Joseon Dynasty. The hospital was founded in 1885 and began accepting a small class of students for training in Western medicine.

Starring Park Yong-woo, Han Hye-jin and Yeon Jung-hoon, the series aired on SBS from January 4 to May 4, 2010 on Mondays and Tuesdays at 21:55 for 36 episodes.

Plot
Jejungwon (originally known as Gwanghyewon, or "House of Extended Grace"; the name was later changed to Jejungwon and then Severance Hospital after a major donor) was established in 1885 by Emperor Gojong at the suggestion of Horace Newton Allen, one of the newly arrived American medical missionaries. The first modern Western hospital in the Kingdom of Joseon, Jejungwon is documented as treating sick people regardless of their economic status, despite the hierarchical society of the era.

With Allen as its first hospital director, Jejungwon accepted 16 students for medical training. The series follows their training and careers.

Characters
Hwang Jung was born to a family of butchers. Considered the lowest social rank in Joseon, along with gravediggers and executioners, butchers were not allowed to have family names. Hwang Jung is initially called "Little Dog." Expected to become a butcher like his father before him, Hwang Jung is intelligent and literate, and dreams of becoming something more. The death of his mother, who was unable to get treatment because of her low social status, drives him to pursue Western medicine. He worked first as a groundskeeper at the hospital before becoming a student there. He works his way up to become Joseon's first surgeon and one of the country's premier doctors. He later joined the independence movement, while continuing work as a physician. (Hwang Jung is based on real-life historical figure Park Seo-yang.)
Baek Do-yang is a bright and ambitious nobleman, the only son of the Minister of Justice. His father is adamant that he enter the civil service, and he performs as the top student at the royal academy. But Do-yang is fascinated by Western medicine, and secretly reads all the medical books he can. He decides to give up his enviable social status and studies medicine at Jejungwon, where he enters into an intense rivalry with Hwang Jung.
Yoo Seok-ran is a modern woman in her era. She was born to wealthy parents (her father is a court interpreter and merchant) who permitted her to be educated, unlike most young women of her class. She becomes fluent in English and dresses in Western clothing. While working at Jejungwon as Allen's interpreter, she is drawn to Hwang Jung. But she is engaged to Baek Do-yangm whom she's known since childhood. Under Lilias Horton's mentorship, Seok-ran studies to become Joseon's first female doctor in Western medicine.

As modern medical science clashes with old practices in turn of the century Korea, the personal and professional challenges of Jejungwon's doctors take place against the historical and social turbulence of the times.

Cast

Park Yong-woo as Hwang Jung
Cha Jae-dol as young Hwang Jung
Han Hye-jin as Yoo Seok-ran  
Yeon Jung-hoon as Baek Do-yang
Shin Dong-ki as young Baek Do-yang
Sean Richard Dulake as Horace Newton Allen  
Kim Kap-soo as Yoo Hee-seo
Seo In-seok as Baek Tae-hyun
Jang Hang-sun as "Yard Dog," Hwang Jung's father
Do Ki-seok as Mong Chong
Choi Jong-hwan as Emperor Gojong
Kang Nam-gil as Watanabe
Jang Hyun-sung as Min Young-ik
Yoo Tae-woong as Kim Ok-gyun
Kim Seung-wook as Hong Young-shik
Cha Hwa-yeon as Hwang Jung's mother
Jung Suk-yong as Lee Kwak/Jak Dae
Yoon Gi-won as Yoon Je-wook
Won Ki-joon as Evangelist Jung 
Geum Bo-ra as Seok-ran's mother
Seo Hye-rin as Kim Mak-saeng
Jung Gyu-soo as Japanese minister
Kwon Hae-hyo as Oh Chung-hwan
Ricky Kim as John William Heron
Fabien Yoon as Oliver Avison
Catherine Baillie as Lilias Horton
Seo Yi-sook as Queen Min
Yoo Hye-jung as Park So-sa
Kim Tae-hee as Mi-ryung 
Choi Su-rin as Mak-saeng	
Shin Ji-soo as Nang-rang
Song Young-kyu as Go Jang-geun
Kim Gyu-jin as Chil-bok
Lee Hyo-jung as Baek Kyu-hyun
Kim Ho-chang as physician
Ha Dae-ro as physician
Choi Ja-hye as nurse Naoko
Lee Sol-gu as patient
Seok Jin-yi as Suzuki
Lee Jung-yong as Lee Yong-ik
Jeon Jin-ki as Sugimura
Song Soo-hyun as Chi-roo's daughter
Oh Ji-heon as Japanese soldier
Song Bong-geun
Min Joon-hyun
Yoon Seo-hyun
Heo Joon-suk
Jeon Ji-hoo as supporting
Lee Sang-yoon as Ji Seok-young (cameo)
Park No-shik as patient (cameo)
Lee Jin as Young-in (cameo)
Ki Tae-young as Jwauijeong's son (cameo, ep 22)
Son Hyun-joo as general (cameo) 
 Kim Sung-oh as Sungkyunkwan scholar
 Kim Ji-hyun as Chwi-ran

International broadcast
It aired in Thailand on Channel 3  beginning May 20, 2012, dubbed as Jejungwon Tảnān phæthy̒ h̄æ̀ng Joseon. ("เจจุงวอน ตำนานแพทย์แห่งโชซอน", literally: Jejungwon: Legendary Doctor of Joseon).

References

External links
 Jejungwon official SBS website 
 
 

2010 South Korean television series debuts
2010 South Korean television series endings
Anti-Japanese sentiment in Korea
Seoul Broadcasting System television dramas
Television series set in the Joseon dynasty
Television series set in the Korean Empire
Television series set in Korea under Japanese rule
South Korean historical television series
South Korean medical television series
Television series by Kim Jong-hak Production